Hand percussion is a percussion instrument that is held in the hand. They can be made from wood, metal or plastic, bottles stops and are usually shaken, scraped, or tapped with fingers or a stick. It includes all instruments that are not drums or pitched percussion instruments such as the marimba or the xylophone.

Types

Shakers 

A shaker (percussion) is any instrument that sounds when shaken. Historically, naturally occurring items such as seed pots were the first shakers.  A caxixi is a basketwork shaker made from a gourd. Gourds are used all over the world, covered with a net with shells or seeds to create an instrument such as the shekere. Modern shakers are often cylinders made from metal, wood, or plastic containing small hard items such as seeds, stones, or plastic - an example is the egg shaker. Another category of shaken instrument uses jingles, discs of metal tap together when shaken. Tambourines also fall into this category, using several zills to produce their sound.

Scrapers 

Scrapers have ridges on the body. Often known as Guiro, rhythms are created by running a thin stick up and down the ridges at different speeds. Gourds or bamboo have traditionally been used as Guiros, as they have a resonant hollow body, and can easily be cut with ridges. A common type from Asia is a carved wooden frog with ridges cut on its back and its mouth and belly hollowed out.

Cowbells 

Cowbells originate from the bells tied around the necks of livestock. They are any type of bell tapped with fingers, or with a beater. They are found all over the world and are used extensively in Latin percussion and often found as part of a standard rock drum kit. The name cowbell usually refers to a single bell, the Agogô bell usually refers to a double or triple bell.

Triangles 

The triangle is a piece of metal bent in the shape of a triangle that is struck with a metal beater. It is generally suspended by a string to allow it to resonate. The performer's hand can open or close to mute the sound. Triangles are commonly used in South American music to give a persistent high pitched pulse.

Sticks 

Tapping two sticks together is the simplest form of hand percussion, and has developed a place in traditional music all over the world. Indigenous Australians use clapping sticks alongside the didgeridoo, and claves are an integral part of South American music.

Small drums 
A variety of small hand held drums such as tamborim fall into the Hand Percussion category.

Listening

References